Krishna is an Indian actor who appears mainly in the Malayalam cinema industry. He has acted more than 50 films. He was born on 23 March 1980 in Kerala. He is a very talented actor who worked in many movies.  
He made his acting debut at the age of 14 as a child artist in the Malayalam film Napoleon (1994). His debut as a lead role in Rishyasringan in 1997 with Bhanupriya. Later krishna act with Manju Warrier in Daya. He acted in several movies at the end of the 1990s in films such as Ayal Kadha Ezhuthukayanu, Harikrishnans, Independence (1999 film), Vazhunnor, etc. In 2001 Krishna debuted in Tamil through Piriyadha Varam Vendum.

Personal life
Krishna is the eldest of two children born to Mohan Divakaran and Radhalakshmi at Kainakary, Alappuzha.  Krishna is the grandson of actor Lalitha of the famous Lalitha-Padmini-Ragini trio, has a younger brother, Sanker. He had his primary education from Bhavans Vidya Mandir, Elamakkara. He pursued a degree in arts from Sacred Heart College, Thevara.

He is married to Sikha, who is an advocate in the Kerala High Court. The couple has a son, Shiv, and a daughter Gouri. He currently resides at Kochi with family. He is the owner of Tandoor Chillies restaurant in Kochi.

He is the relative of South Indian actress Shobana, Vineeth and grandson of actress Lalitha. and actresses Padmini, Ragini, Ambika Sukumaran, Sukumari are his grandaunts.

Filmography

All films are in Malayalam language unless otherwise noted.

Television career
As actor
Sthreejanmam (Surya TV)
Akkare Akkare (Surya TV)
Megham(Asianet)
Amma Manasu (Asianet)
Mandharam (Kairali TV)
Ivide
Pookkaalam (Surya TV)
Sayvinte Makkal (Mazhavil Manorama)
Pokkuveyil (Flowers)
Kabani (Zee Keralam)
Kerala Samajam : Oru Pravasi Kadha (Asianet)
Thinkalkalamaan (Surya TV)
Swantham Sujatha (Surya TV)
As Judge
Pachakarani  (Kairali TV)
Vivel Big Break (Surya TV)
Celebrity Kitchen Magic (Kairali TV) 
Celebrity Kitchen Magic Season 2 (Kairali TV)
Celebrity Kitchen Magic Season 3 (Kairali TV)

References

External links
 
 Krishna at MSI
 http://entertainment.oneindia.in/celebs/krishna-malayalam-actor.html
 http://www.malayalachalachithram.com/profiles.php?i=5689

Indian male film actors
Male actors from Alappuzha
Male actors in Malayalam cinema
Living people
20th-century Indian male actors
21st-century Indian male actors
Male actors in Malayalam television
Indian male television actors
1980 births